Hébras is a French surname. Notable people with the surname include:

Robert Hébras (1925–2023), French Resistance member
Simon Hébras (born 1988), French footballer

French-language surnames